Milan Radivojević was a Yugoslav basketball player.

Playing career 
During his playing career in the 1950s, Radivojević was on Belgrade-based teams Partizan and Crvena zvezda of the Yugoslav Federal League. During his stint with Crvena zvezda he won two Yugoslav Championships.

Career achievements and awards 
 Yugoslav League champion: 2 (with Crvena zvezda: 1953, 1954).

See also 
 KK Partizan all-time roster

References

KK Crvena zvezda players
KK Partizan players
Serbian men's basketball players
Yugoslav men's basketball players
Year of birth missing
Year of death missing
Place of birth missing
Place of death missing